The Edmonton Stingers are a Canadian professional basketball team based in Edmonton, Alberta. They compete in the Canadian Elite Basketball League (CEBL) and play their home games at the HIVE arena at the Edmonton Expo Centre. The Stingers' mascot is Buzz, a hornet, inspired by the CF-18 based in Cold Lake. The team logo has a CF-18 going through a capital E to make the body of the hornet.

History
On May 2, 2018, it was announced that Edmonton would be one of the six cities to participate in the Canadian Elite Basketball League, with the team expected to play its inaugural season beginning in May 2019. On June 22, 2018, it was announced that the team would be called the Edmonton Stingers.

The Edmonton Stingers played their inaugural game on May 10, 2019 against the Niagara River Lions, winning 118-105. In their debut season, the Stingers were eliminated in the semifinals.

In the 2020 season, Edmonton won its first CEBL championship after beating the Fraser Valley Bandits in the final, 90–73. Xavier Moon, who scored 30 points, was named Most Valuable Player of the championship game.

In the 2021 season, Edmonton won its second consecutive championship, making them the leagues first back to back champions 101-65 over the Niagara River Lions. 

On September 22, 2021 Edmonton announced that they would compete in the 2021–22 BCL Americas. In their debut, the Stingers defeated Real Estelí 84-81 in Managua, Nicaragua.

Players

Current roster 
The following is the Edmonton Stingers roster for the 2021–22 BCL Americas season.

Honours

CEBL
Champions (2): 2020, 2021

Season-by-season record

Notable players

  Murphy Burnatowski
  Mikh McKinney
  Trahson Burrell

References

External links 
 Official website

Sports teams in Edmonton
Basketball teams in Alberta
Basketball teams established in 2018
2018 establishments in Alberta
Canadian Elite Basketball League teams